Patrick Forde (13 December 1904 – 7 September 1945) was a Guyanese cricketer. He played in one first-class match for British Guiana in 1924/25.

See also
 List of Guyanese representative cricketers

References

External links
 

1904 births
1945 deaths
Guyanese cricketers
Guyana cricketers
Sportspeople from Georgetown, Guyana